DLI may refer to:

 Daily light integral, the number of photons received in an area
 Defense Language Institute of the US DoD
 Delhi Junction railway station (station code DLI)
 Durham Light Infantry, UK
 Donor lymphocyte infusion, immunotherapy 
 Delay line interferometer
 Digital Library of India
 Department of Land Information,  Western Australia
 Data Language Interface (DL/I) to IBM's IMS databases
 551 in Roman numerals
 Lien Khuong Airport IATA code